Meritaten, also spelled Merytaten, Meritaton or Meryetaten (14th century BC), was an ancient Egyptian royal woman of the Eighteenth Dynasty of Egypt. Her name means "She who is beloved of Aten"; Aten being the sun-deity whom her father, Pharaoh Akhenaten, worshipped. She held several titles, performing official roles for her father and becoming the Great Royal Wife to Pharaoh Smenkhkare, who may have been a brother or son of Akhenaten. Meritaten also may have served as pharaoh in her own right under the name Ankhkheperure Neferneferuaten.

Family
Meritaten was the first of six daughters  born to Pharaoh Akhenaten and his Great Royal Wife, Nefertiti. Her sisters are Meketaten, Ankhesenpaaten, Neferneferuaten Tasherit, Neferneferure, and Setepenre. Meritaten is mentioned in diplomatic letters, by the name Mayati. She is mentioned in a letter from Abimilki of Tyre. The reference usually is thought to date to the period when Meritaten's position at court became more important, during the latter part of the reign of Akhenaten. It is possible, however, that the letter refers to the birth of Meritaten.

She was married to Pharaoh Smenkhare.

Inscriptions mention a young princess named Meritaten Tasherit, who may be the daughter of Meritaten and Smenkhare. Inscriptions from Ashmunein suggest that Meritaten-tasherit is the daughter of Meritaten. The scene dates to the reign of Akhenaten, and this means the father of the young princess could be Akhenaten. If so, this means Akhenaten took his own daughters as wives. Another princess named Ankhesenpaaten Tasherit had been suggested as an additional daughter of Meritaten, but it is more likely that she is a daughter of Ankhesenpaaten.

Biography

Early years in Thebes
Meritaten most likely was born in Thebes, early in her father's marriage to Nefertiti, perhaps before he assumed the throne, as she is shown officiating during year five of his reign. The royal family first lived in Thebes and the royal palace may have been part of the Temple Complex of Akhenaten at Karnak. The exact use of the buildings in Karnak is not known, but the scenes decorating the Teni-menu suggest it may have served as a residence. Meritaten is depicted beside her mother Nefertiti in reliefs carved into the Hut-Benben. The Hut-Benben was a structure associated with Nefertiti, who is the main officiant in the scenes, the great royal wife being the highest priestess. Meritaten appears behind her mother shaking a sistrum. Her younger sisters Meketaten and Ankhesenpaaten also appear in some of the scenes, but not so often as Meritaten.

Amarna princess

In year five of her father Akhenaten's reign, Meritaten appears on the boundary stelae designating the boundaries of the new capital to which her father moved the royal family and his administrators. During Akhenaten's reign, she was the most frequently depicted and mentioned of the six daughters. Her figure appears on paintings in temples, tombs, and private chapels. Not only is she shown among images showing the family life of the pharaoh, which were typical of the Amarna Period, but on those depicting official ceremonies, as well.

The two structures most associated with Meritaten at Amarna are the Northern Palace and the Maru-Aten. The Maru-Aten was located to the south of the city limits of Amarna. The structure consisted of two enclosures containing pools or lakes and pavilions set in an area planted with trees. An artificial island contained a pillared construction that held a painted pavement showing scenes from nature.

Meritaten's name seems to replace that of another royal lady in several places, among them in the Northern Palace and in the Maru-Aten. This had been misinterpreted as evidence of Nefertiti's disgrace and banishment from the royal court but, more recently, the erased inscriptions turned out to be the name of Kiya, one of Akhenaten's secondary wives, disproving that interpretation.

Great Royal Wife

At some point, Meritaten married Smenkhare and became his Great Royal Wife. She is depicted with him in the tomb of Meryre II, bestowing honors and gifts upon Meryre. The chronology of the final years of the Amarna Period is unclear, however Smenkhare is believed to have served as a co-regent to Akhenaten. Meritaten was the Great Royal Wife to Smenkhare, while Nefertiti continued as the Great Royal Wife of Akhenaten. Nefertiti still held the Great Royal Wife title in year 16, hence Smenkhare must have been a co-regent at that time, or otherwise ruled with his wife Meritaten sometime after year 16 of Akhenaten.

Meritaten is mentioned on gold daisies that decorated a garment found in Tutankhamen's tomb. She also is mentioned on a wooden box meant to contain linen garments. The box mentions two kings: Neferkheperure-Waenre (Akhenaten) and Ankhkheperure-mr-waenre, Neferneferuaten-mr-waenre and the Great Royal Wife Meritaten.

According to some scholars, such as J.P. Allen, Ankhkheperure Smenkhkare ruled together with Meritaten, but in the year following Akhenaten's death, Smenkhkare died. The theory is, that Meritaten was the 'king's daughter' Akenkeres who is recorded in Manetho's Epitome to have assumed the throne next, in her own right as king and bearing the name Neferneferuaten. Neferneferuaten is assigned a reign of two years and one month and is placed in Manetho's account as the immediate predecessor of the king, Rathothis, who is believed to be Tutankhamun, her half-brother by another, unnamed wife of Akhenaten.

Archaeologist Alain Zivie asserts that Meritaten also became a foster mother to Tutankhamun, referred to as Maia in some ancient records. Zivie noted that Thutmose, the sculptor appointed vizier by Akhenaten and who was found to be the creator of the famous bust of Nefertiti also created one of Maïa (Bubasteion I.20), the foster mother of Tutankhamun and who, in fact, was "Merytaten, the elder daughter of Akhenaten", "who sat briefly on the throne".

Death and burial

The texts of its boundary stele mention that Meritaten was meant to be buried at Akhet-Aten (modern Amarna).
Let a tomb be made for me in the eastern mountain of Akhetaten. Let my burial be made in it, in the millions of jubilees which the Aten, my father, has decreed for me. Let the burial of the Great King's Wife, Nefertiti, be made in it, in the millions of years which the Aten, my father, decreed for her. Let the burial of the King's Daughter, Meritaten, [be made] in it, in these millions of years.

The royal tomb in Amarna was used for the burial of Meketaten, Tiye, and Akhenaten, and likely was closed after the death and burial of Akhenaten. After that, Meritaten's burial may have been planned for one of the other royal tombs in Amarna.

References

External links 
"Head Case", King Tut Photograph Gallery, National Geographic Magazine online 

Queens consort of the Eighteenth Dynasty of Egypt
Princesses of the Eighteenth Dynasty of Egypt
14th-century BC Egyptian women
Children of Akhenaten
Nefertiti
People from Thebes, Egypt